Juan Carlos Czentoriky (13 January 1946 – 29 May 2017) was an Argentine football player.

Career
Czentoriky began his playing career with Argentine second division club San Telmo. He made his professional debut against Argentino de Quilmes on 9 March 1968, and would make 90 league appearances for the club, scoring 35 goals.

In 1971, Czentoriky joined México Primera División side Club Jalisco. He would later play for Unión de Curtidores, Puebla F.C. and Orinegros from Ciudad Madero in the Mexican league.

References

External links
Profile at BDFA.com.ar

1946 births
2017 deaths
Argentine footballers
Argentine expatriate footballers
Club Puebla players
Liga MX players
Expatriate footballers in Mexico
Association football midfielders
Footballers from Rosario, Santa Fe